Enzo Díaz may refer to:

 Enzo Díaz (footballer, born 1992), Argentine forward
 Enzo Díaz (footballer, born 1995), Argentine midfielder